Sullan is a 2004 Indian Tamil-language action film written and directed by Ramana. The film stars Dhanush, along with Sindhu Tolani, Manivannan, Pasupathy and Easwari Rao among others. It was released on 23 July 2004.

Plot 
Subramani, known as Sullan among his friends, is the son of Mani, a corporation garbage lorry driver. A first-year college student, his only objective in life is to have fun with his friends. He falls in love with Kavya. Soori is a moneylender who charges atrocious rates and then goes after those who fail to pay him back. When Soori's actions start to affect Sullan's family and friends, he strikes back.

Cast
Dhanush as Subramani (Sullan)
Sindhu Tolani as Kavya
Manivannan as Mani, Sullan's father
Pasupathy as Soori
Easwari Rao as Karpagam
Delhi Ganesh
Vasu Vikram
Kalairani
Thennavan
Muthukaalai
Besant Ravi
Sanghavi (special appearance)

Soundtrack

Soundtrack was composed by Vidyasagar and lyrics written by Arivumathi, Pa. Vijay, Kabilan, Na. Muthukumar and Yugabharathi.

Critical reception
Indiaglitz wrote "weak screenplay and poor characterization makes Sullan, a big disappointment". Sify wrote "Ramana's narrative and script are absurd and his attempt to make Dhanush a superstar material has failed miserably. Sullan is all sound and no fury". B. Balaji wrote "With such over-the-top situations and graphics-filled stunts, the fight sequences in Sullaan look like they belong in a cartoon!". Chennai Online wrote "Director Ramana, who gave a success with his debut film 'Thirumalai', seems to lose control over his script, characters and artistes from the early scenes itself. The whole scenario being crass and loud, subtlety seems to be the last thing on the director's mind." Visual Dasan of Kalki criticised the characters of hero, heroine and villain behaving like hyper active patients, concluding the film had no story or whatsoever.

References

External links 
 

2004 films
2000s action drama films
2000s masala films
2000s Tamil-language films
Films scored by Vidyasagar
Indian action drama films